Wriedt is a surname. Notable people with the surname include:

Etta Wriedt (1859-1942), American spiritual medium
Ken Wriedt (1927–2010), Australian politician
Kwasi Okyere Wriedt (born 1994), Ghanaian footballer
Paula Wriedt (born 1968), Australian politician

See also 
FV August Wriedt, two fishing vessels carrying the name August Wriedt were requisioned by the Kriegsmarine during World War II.